Corquín is a town, with a population of 6,728 (2013 census), and a  municipality in the Honduran department of Copán.

References 

Municipalities of the Copán Department